Mason Graham (born September 2, 2003) is an American football defensive tackle for the Michigan Wolverines.

Early life and high school career
Graham was born on September 2, 2003. He attended Servite High School in Anaheim, California. In December 2021 he was selected by the Los Angeles Times as the high school football player of the year and a MaxPreps All American. He was also a star wrestler at Servite.

College career
After watching Michigan play Washington in Ann Arbor in September 2021, Graham committed to the University of Michigan. He saw extensive playing time as a true freshman for the 2022 Michigan Wolverines football team. After his freshman year at Michigan, Graham was named to the Freshman All-America football team.

References

External links
 Michigan Wolverines bio

2003 births
Living people
American football defensive tackles
Michigan Wolverines football players
People from Anaheim, California
Players of American football from Michigan